Saqib Hanif (born 28 April 1994) is a Pakistani footballer who plays as a goalkeeper for Club Green Streets in the Dhivehi Premier League. He made his international debut for them in 2013 against Bangladesh in 2013 SAFF Championship at the age of 19. He made his debut for the national under-23 team at the 2018 Asian Games against Vietnam under-23.

Career statistics

International

Honours
Khan Research Laboratories
Pakistan Premier League: 2012–13
National Football Challenge Cup: 2012, 2015, 2016

References

Living people
1994 births
Pakistani footballers
Pakistani expatriate footballers
Pakistan international footballers
Association football goalkeepers
Footballers at the 2014 Asian Games
Pakistani expatriate sportspeople in the Maldives
Expatriate footballers in the Maldives
Footballers at the 2018 Asian Games
Asian Games competitors for Pakistan
SSGC F.C. players